
Hand of Kindness is the third solo album by singer/songwriter/guitarist Richard Thompson. It was recorded and released in 1983, after a ten year collaboration with former wife Linda Thompson. It is his first album of original solo material since Henry the Human Fly (1972).

After the "Tour From Hell" to promote Shoot Out the Lights (recorded with his wife), Richard resumed his own career as a recording and performing artist.

Several songs feature the twin saxophones of Pete Zorn and Pete Thomas, and for about 18 months after the release of Hand of Kindness, Thompson toured with his "Big Band" that featured the two sax players prominently.

The album opens with "Tear-Stained Letter", later a country music top ten hit for Jo-El Sonnier. Thompson's ex-wife Linda cited album track "How I Wanted To" as her favorite of her former husband's songs.

The album's cover photo features Thompson holding an acoustic guitar made for him by American luthier Danny Ferrington; the same guitar appears on the cover of Thompson's next release, Small Town Romance.

Track listing

Personnel
Richard Thompson - guitar, vocals
Dave Pegg - bass guitar
Dave Mattacks - drums
Simon Nicol - guitar
Pete Zorn - saxophone, backing vocals
Pete Thomas - saxophone
John Hiatt, Bobby King and Clive Gregson - backing vocals
John Kirkpatrick - accordion, concertina
Aly Bain - violin

References

1983 albums
Richard Thompson (musician) albums
Albums produced by Joe Boyd
Hannibal Records albums